The Monadnock Building is an historic 10-story, 204,625 square foot office building in downtown San Francisco, California located at 685 Market St. The building was designed by the firm of Frederick H. Meyer and Smith, and completed in 1907, immediately following the 1906 San Francisco earthquake. The building stands immediately adjacent to both the BART Montgomery Street Station and the Palace Hotel, and across Market Street from Lotta's Fountain.

The Monadnock Building is an example of the turn-of-the-century Beaux Arts-style. The building was extensively renovated in 1986, and again in 2016. Macys.com is a major tenant and Uber became a major tenant in 2014.

References

Office buildings in San Francisco
1907 establishments in California
Beaux-Arts architecture in California